Korogwe Urban District (or Korogwe Town Council) is one of the eleven districts of the Tanga Region of Tanzania. Korogwe Urban District is bordered to the north by Korogwe Rural District and to the south by Handeni Rural District. The administrative capital of the district is Korogwe town.
According to the 2012 Tanzania National Census, the population of Korogwe Urban District was 68,308.

Transport
Paved trunk road T2 from Dar es Salaam to Arusha passes through the district.

Administrative subdivisions
As of 2012, Korogwe Urban District was administratively divided into 8 wards.

Wards

 Kilole
 Kwamndolwa
 Kwamsisi
 Magunga
 Manundu
 Mtonga
 Ngombezi
 Old Korogwe

References

Districts of Tanga Region